Alexandra Athletic Football Club was a 19th-century football club from Dennistoun, in Glasgow, which participated in the early years of the Scottish Cup.

History

The football club was founded in 1873 as an all-round athletics club, with football as the "ruling pastime"; originally, the club's request to use part of Alexandra Park as a home ground was declined, despite the club being "a body of working men...who had done a very gracious thing in asking permission to get the use of a portion of the park".  Within two months however the new club was given permission to lease part of the park for sporting activities; by this time the Earl of Glasgow and Robert Dalglish MP had agreed to become the club's patrons and the club had an elite image, with amongst the best sporting facilities and equipment in Glasgow.

By the following season, the issue had been sorted out, and the club was able to play its first Scottish FA Cup tie on the park; after beating Callander F.C. at home in the first round, the club lost 2-0 to Blythswood in the second (last eight), the club complaining that the Blythswood-nominated umpire was not merely a member of the Blythswood club, but had also been giving coaching advice during the match; nevertheless the clubs enjoyed a convivial toast after the match.

At the end of 1875, the club played an exhibition match in Dundee, with the aim of promoting the association game there; the one Dundee club that had played association before (in 1871) had quickly switched to rugby.

The club entered the Scottish Cup until 1884, after which there is no further record.  The club reached the second round in 1876-77, beating Eastern F.C. in the first round, but losing 4-0 at Northern in the second.  The win over Eastern was at the third time of asking, the clubs having drawn in the first game, and Eastern winning the second 2-0, but being the subject of a successful post-match protest on the basis that the referee who took charge of the match had not been agreed beforehand; ironically, this was down to Eastern objecting to the Alexandra nominee, but Eastern called the protest "a mean subterfuge to attempt to wrest the honours which have already been fairly won".

The following year, the club Lancefield F.C. in the first round but losing 8-0 at Rangers in the next.  In 1878-79 the club had its best run, reaching the fourth round (last 18), but again losing to Rangers, this time 3-0.  It was the club's best run in the competition.

The club does not seem to have survived the 1883-84 season; it protested to no avail after being knocked out of the Cup by Whitehill, and the final match being a 9-4 defeat at Arbroath, after the club was 4-1 up at half-time.  On the club's demise, a number of its members and players joined Rangers; club secretary Walter Crichton took the same role at the Light Blues.

Colours

The club played in a variety of colours:

1873: blue & white guernsey, blue knickerbockers, red cap
1874: brown, blue, & white striped jersey, white knickerbockers, blue stockings, red cap
1876: white with blue Prince of Wales feathers
1877: white

Notable players
James Gossland and James Duncan, who both won international caps when playing for Rangers; Duncan's first two caps came when playing for the A.A.C.

External links
Scottish Football Club Directory (Archived 2009-10-25)
RSSSF: Scottish Cup

References

Defunct football clubs in Scotland
Football clubs in Glasgow
Association football clubs established in 1873
Association football clubs disestablished in 1884
1873 establishments in Scotland
1884 disestablishments in Scotland